This is the mayors list of São Bento, Paraíba, the Brazilian state of Paraiba.

External links
Resultado de eleições anteriores

References

sao bento